Incahuasi District or Inkawasi (Quechua Inka Inca, wasi house, "Inca house") is one of six districts of the Ferreñafe Province in the Department of Lambayeque in Peru.

Ethnic groups 
The people in the district are mainly indigenous citizens of Quechua descent. Quechua (Inkawasi-Kañaris Quechua) is the language which the majority of the population (85.72%) learnt to speak in childhood, 14.08% of the residents started speaking using the Spanish language (2007 Peru Census).

References